The common name Chinese yew refers to either of the following three yew species:

Taxus celebica
Taxus chinensis
Taxus sumatrana